Trần Bửu Ngọc (born 26 February 1991) is a Vietnamese footballer who plays as a goalkeeper for Hoàng Anh Gia Lai.

International career
He made his international debut for Vietnam on 22 March 2013 in a match against Hong Kong.

Honours

Club
Đông Á Thanh Hóa
Vietnamese National Cup:
 Third place : 2022

References

External links
 

1991 births
Living people
Vietnamese footballers
Vietnam international footballers
Association football goalkeepers
Footballers at the 2014 Asian Games
Dong Thap FC players
Can Tho FC players
V.League 1 players
Asian Games competitors for Vietnam